Amabel is a given name and may refer to:

 Amabel Anderson Arnold (1883-1936), American lawyer
 Amabel Hume-Campbell, 1st Countess de Grey (1751-1833), British diarist and political writer 
 Lady Amabel Kerr (1846-1906), English writer
 Amabel Scharff Roberts (1891-1918), American nurse 
 Amabel Williams-Ellis (1894 -1984), English writer, critic